"Between the Devil and Me" is a song written by Harley Allen and Carson Chamberlain, and recorded by American country music singer Alan Jackson.  It was released in October 1997 as the fifth single from his album Everything I Love.  It peaked at number two on the U.S. Billboard country singles charts, behind Martina McBride's "A Broken Wing".

Content
"Between the Devil and Me" was written by Harley Allen and Carson Chamberlain, the same two songwriters who wrote the title track to Everything I Love. The song is a mid-tempo ballad in which the male narrator describes the sexual temptation of an extramarital affair, by saying that "she's all I see / Between the devil and me."

Critical reception
Stephen Thomas Erlewine of Allmusic said that although the song had "a bit of post-Garth bombast" and "touches on the anthemic sounds of modern country", it still had Jackson's "true country spin and heart." Entertainment Weekly critic Alanna Nash also cited the song as a standout, saying that Jackson made the song "throb with anxiety."

Chart performance

Year-end charts

References

1997 singles
Alan Jackson songs
Songs written by Harley Allen
Songs written by Carson Chamberlain
Song recordings produced by Keith Stegall
Arista Nashville singles
1996 songs